The 2018 South Dakota State Jackrabbits football team represented South Dakota State University in the 2018 NCAA Division I FCS football season. They were led by 22nd-year head coach John Stiegelmeier and played their home games at Dana J. Dykhouse Stadium in Brookings, South Dakota as members of the Missouri Valley Football Conference. They finished the season 10–3, 6–2 in MVFC play to finish in second place. They received an at-large bid to the FCS Playoffs where they defeated Duquesne in the second round and Kennesaw State in the quarterfinals, before losing in the semifinals to North Dakota State.

Previous season
The Jackrabbits finished the 2017 season 11–3, 6–2 in MVFC play to finish in a tie for second place. They received an at-large bid to the FCS Playoffs where they defeated Northern Iowa in the second round and New Hampshire in the quarterfinals before losing in the semifinals to James Madison.

Preseason

Award watch lists

Preseason MVFC poll
The MVFC released their preseason poll on July 29, 2018, with the Jackrabbits predicted to finish in second place.

Preseason All-MVFC Teams
The Jackrabbits placed seven players at eight positions on the preseason all-MVFC teams.

Offense

1st team

Taryn Christion – QB

Chase Vinatieri – K

2nd team

Luke Sellers – FB

Cade Johnson – WR

Bradey Sorenson – LS

Defense

1st team

Christian Rozeboom – LB

Jordan Brown – DB

2nd team

Cade Johnson – WR

Schedule

Source: Schedule

Roster

Game summaries

Montana State

Arkansas–Pine Bluff

at North Dakota State

Indiana State

Youngstown State

at Northern Iowa

at Illinois State

Missouri State

at Southern Illinois

South Dakota

FCS Playoffs

Duquesne–Second Round

at Kennesaw State–Quarterfinals

at North Dakota State–Semifinals

Ranking movements

Players drafted into the NFL

References

South Dakota State
South Dakota State Jackrabbits football seasons
South Dakota State
South Dakota State Jackrabbits football